Greenhead is an unincorporated community in Washington County, Florida, United States. It is located along State Road 77 north of Sand Hills (Florida), and is the home of the Greenhead Gun Club LLC. Greenhead is also the location of the deed-restricted Grassy Pond Community, surrounding Grassy Pond and is governed by a homeowners' association.

References

Unincorporated communities in Washington County, Florida
Unincorporated communities in Florida